The Clayton Brothers is the brain child of saxophonist Jeff Clayton. According to Jeff, some 30 years ago he and his brother, Grammy Award winning bassist John Clayton, agreed to support each other's preferred formats. Jeff's love of small groups lead to formation of the Clayton Brothers Quintet. John's love for big bands led to formation of the Clayton-Hamilton Jazz Orchestra with drummer Jeff Hamilton, of which brother Jeff is a part. The current roster of the Clayton Brothers Quintet includes brothers Jeff and John, along with John's son Gerald Clayton (piano), Obed Calvaire (drums) and Terell Stafford (trumpet). The band's latest album The Gathering was released in December 2012.

Personnel

Jeff Clayton
Jeff Clayton plays reed instruments alto sax and oboe, in addition to the French horn and flute.  He has performed and recorded with various well known musicians such as Stevie Wonder, Gladys Knight, Kenny Rogers, Michael Jackson, Chaka Khan, Queen Latifah, Patti LaBelle, Earth, Wind & Fire, Barry Manilow, D. J. Rogers, Madonna, Justin Timberlake, Quincy Jones, Valerie King, Helen Baylor, etc. He also has worked with numerous well-known jazz artists such as B.B. King, Frank Sinatra, Ella Fitzgerald, Sammy Davis, Jr., Woody Herman, Lionel Hampton, Diana Krall, Freddie Hubbard, Lena Horne, McCoy Tyner, John Pizzarelli, Dee Dee Bridgewater, and Ray Charles.

John Clayton
John Clayton is a bassist and also a composer/arranger/conductor.  He has worked for the Los Angeles Philharmonic as the Artistic Director of Jazz from 1998 through 2001.  His work was recognized by NARA and nominated for multiple Grammy awards.  He has received a Grammy award for Instrumental Arrangement Accompanying Vocalist(s): Queen Latifah's "I'm Gonna Live Till I Die," as arranger in 2008.  He has written and/or arranged music for Milt Jackson, Nancy Wilson, Ray Brown, Regina Carter, McCoy Tyner, Carmen McRae, Quincy Jones, Diana Krall, Kurt Elling, Dee Dee Bridgewater, Gladys Knight, Natalie Cole, Whitney Houston, etc.

Discography
It's All in the Family  (Concord, 1980)
The Music (Capri, 1991)
Expressions (Warner Bros, 1997)
Siblingity (Warner Bros, 2000)
Back in the Swing oh Things (Sindrome,2005)
Brother to Brother (ArtistShare, 2008)
The Gathering (ArtistShare, 2012)
Soul Brothers (ArtistShare, 2016)

Brother to Brother

ArtistShare Project-Brother to Brother
ArtistShare has been well known for their "Fan-funded" projects.  The Clayton Brothers joined ArtistShare to provide unique participant offers to let their fans to have exclusive access to videos, audio shows, downloads, photos and updates on the project.  If participants fund the project at higher level, they can have an autographed and personalized CD, narrated listening guide to the recordings by the artists, an iPod pre-loaded with the artists' favorite music, VIP access to performances with backstage access etc.

Reviews
Brother to Brother has been receiving reviews that highly value the album.  
 
 New York Times
 Hartford Courant
 Jazz Review
 Jazz.com
 The Providence American
 Buffalo News
 Cabaret Exchange

American jazz ensembles